Juffair is a district situated in Manama, Bahrain. It was originally a separate village inhabited by Shia Muslims but it has been absorbed by the suburban expansion of Manama in the 20th century, and presently includes large parts of land reclaimed from the sea. It is home to many hotels, restaurants, flats, and villas. 

It is also the site of Bahrain's largest mosque, Al Fateh Grand Mosque, which houses the National Library.

History
In 1908, John Gordon Lorimer's Gazetteer of the Persian Gulf described Juffair as a village located on the northern tip of the cape of Juffair. It boasted 80 reed huts occupied by Baharna, cultivators and fishermen. The village was home to 15 pearling vessels at the time. A large clump of 900 date palms existed to the southwestern portion of the village alongside lucerne fields. A census of livestock showed 2 horses, 7 donkeys, and 4 cattle at the time. 

A British naval installation known as HMS Jufair was established near the old Juffair village on April 13, 1935, in the area where ASU-SWA is located today. In 1950, the United States Navy leased office space aboard HMS JUFFAIR from the British. In 1971, after their treaty expired, the British left Bahrain, granting the island total independence. The United States, through agreement with the Bahraini government, took over part of HMS JUFFAIR, renaming it Administrative Support Unit Bahrain, subsequently Naval Support Activity Bahrain. Many Westerners live in Juffair.

Amenities
The offices of the Ministry of Islamic Affairs, Central Informatics Organization, Bahrain Society of Engineers, and the Bahrain Tribune newspaper are all located in Juffair. The Bahrain School and Modern Knowledge School are both also located in Juffair.

There is a new commercial road in Juffair (Al Shabab Road) that houses many restaurants and retail outlets, such as McDonald's, Chili's, Nando's, Asian Zyng, Dairy Queen, Hardee's, Starbucks, Abraj Grills, and Burger King, etc. Near the entrance of Juffair, there is a building called Murjan Shopping Center that has a large supermarket, a restaurant, post office, and Coffee Bean and Tea Leaf coffee shop. 

The American Naval Support Center is located in Juffair.

See also
Juffair Mall
List of tourist attractions in Bahrain
Culture of Bahrain

References

Populated coastal places in Bahrain
Neighborhoods of Manama